Go Your Own Way is the second studio album to have been released by British singer-songwriter and former Pop Idol runner-up, Gareth Gates. The album is essence split into two sections, with tracks one to ten representing "Night", and tracks eleven to nineteen "Day". In some regions, such as the United Kingdom and Europe, the two regions are split across in two discs; in other regions, the entire album is contained on one disc. The album is Gates' last release on the Sony BMG record label, as sales of Go Your Own Way were much lower than his first studio album, What My Heart Wants to Say, resulting in his record deal being terminated. Three singles were released from the album: "Spirit in the Sky", "Sunshine" and "Say It Isn't So".

Track listing

Charts and certifications

Charts

Certifications

References

External links
 

2003 albums
Gareth Gates albums
19 Recordings albums
Sony BMG albums
Albums produced by Mike Peden